Death Before Dishonor X: State of Emergency (DBD X) was the tenth Death Before Dishonor professional wrestling internet pay-per-view (iPPV) event produced by Ring of Honor (ROH). It took place on September 15, 2012, at the Frontier Fieldhouse in Chicago Ridge, Illinois.

Storylines
DBD X featured professional wrestling matches which involve different wrestlers from pre-existing scripted feuds, plots, and storylines that played out on ROH's television programs. Wrestlers portrayed villains or heroes as they followed a series of events that built tension and culminated in a wrestling match or series of matches.

Results

See also
ROH Death Before Dishonor

References

External links
Ring of Honor's official website

Ring of Honor pay-per-view events
Events in Chicago
Professional wrestling in the Chicago metropolitan area
2010s in Chicago
2012 in Illinois
10
September 2012 events in the United States
2012 Ring of Honor pay-per-view events